Zhongdong is a village within Zhong Cave in Ziyun county of Anshun Prefecture, in Guizhou Province  of China.  The village is located within the Getu River Scenic Area in Shuitang Town.

It is thought to be the only inhabited, year-round settlement in China located inside a naturally occurring cave. The limestone Zhong Cave is the largest of three local caves, set between an upper and lower cave that are uninhabited.

Zhong Cave

Village
Some villagers claim that the village was settled after the 1949 Communist Revolution to escape banditry, while others claim that the village has been there for countless generations before then.

Twenty families, of the Miao ethnic minority, live in the cave, growing corn on the mountain and raising chickens, pigs, and cows. Water is collected from dripping stones, with shortages during the dry season. In 2007, the villagers began building a concrete reservoir to improve water security. As of 2007, the village had a population of close to 100.

The village's houses have woven bamboo walls, and are unique for having no roofs, relying on the cave's natural shelter. The village relies on wood-fired hearths for heat and cooking, but electrical service was set up in the last decade, powering lights and a small number of appliances such as television sets and washing machines.

The Chinese government built concrete housing below the mountain for the Zhongdong villagers, but they refused to move there, citing the housing as substandard. The village has one primary school with six classes and 200 students, many of whom are boarders from other local villages, and it is possibly the only cave school in the world.

See also
 List of villages in China

References

External links 
"Cave School" video segment from "Heart of the Dragon," the first episode in BBC's six-part Wild China documentary series. Directed by Phil Chapman and narrated by Bernard Hill.
“Guizhou Series: Southwest Guizhou - I” episode of CCTV International’s Travelogue. Hosted by Liu Changying. Segment on Zhongdong starts at around 18:10.
"Last Known Cave Dwellers in China" video segment from Reuters News, hosted by Kitty Bu.
Reuters U.S. Edition photograph slide show accompanying article "China's 'last cave dwellers' refuse to leave". Photographer Jason Lee. Five of the nine photos here are not included in the U.K. edition. Four photos are shared.
Reuters U.K. Edition photograph slide show accompanying article "The last cave dwellers refuse to leave". Photographer Jason Lee. Two of the six photos here are not included in the U.S. edition. Four photos are shared.
Chinese School Children Play Basketball photo by Jason Lee, featured in National Geographic's Week in Photos, for the week of February 12, 2007.
"China's Last Known Cave Dwellers" video segment on ABC News (June 16, 2008). Footage of Zhongdong and government-issued houses in the valley below.
"CHINA: Over 100 villagers in remote Guizhou Province say they've found their paradise in a cave" - Reuters raw archival footage at ITN Source, February 25, 2007.

Caves of Guizhou
Limestone caves
Karst formations of China
Geography of Guizhou
Villages in China